Joseph Allen "Country Joe" McDonald (born January 1, 1942) is an American musician who was the lead singer of the 1960s psychedelic rock group Country Joe and the Fish.

Early life and early career 
McDonald was born in Washington, D.C., and grew up in El Monte, California, where he was student conductor and president of his high school marching band. At the age of 17, he enlisted in the United States Navy for three years and was stationed in Japan. After his enlistment, he attended Los Angeles City College for a year. In the early 1960s, he began busking on Telegraph Avenue in Berkeley, California. His father, Worden McDonald, from Oklahoma, was of Scottish Presbyterian heritage (the son of a minister) and worked for a telephone company. His mother, Florence Plotnick, was the daughter of Russian Jewish immigrants and served for many years on the Berkeley City Council. In their youth, both were Communist Party members and named their son after Joseph Stalin, before renouncing the cause.

Music career

McDonald has recorded 33 albums and has written hundreds of songs over a career spanning 60 years. In 1965, he and Barry Melton co-founded Country Joe & the Fish which became a pioneer psychedelic rock band with their eclectic performances at the Avalon Ballroom, the Fillmore Auditorium, the 1967 Monterey Pop Festival, and both the 1969 original and 1979 reunion Woodstock Festivals.

Their best-known song is his "The "Fish" Cheer/I-Feel-Like-I'm-Fixin'-to-Die Rag" (1965), a black comedy novelty song about the Vietnam War, whose familiar chorus ("One, two, three, what are we fighting for?") is well known to the Woodstock generation and Vietnam veterans of the 1960s and '70s. McDonald wrote the song in about 20 minutes for an anti-Vietnam War play. The "Fish Cheer" was the band performing a call-and-response with the audience, spelling the word "fish", followed by Country Joe yelling, "What's that spell?" twice, with the audience responding, and then, the third time, "What's that spell?", followed immediately by the song. The "Fish Cheer" evolved into the "Fuck Cheer" after the Berkeley Free Speech Movement. The cheer was on the original recording of "I-Feel-Like-I'm-Fixin'-To-Die Rag", being played right before the song on the LP of the same name. The cheer became popular and the crowd would spell out F-I-S-H when the band performed live. During the summer of 1968 the band played on the Schaefer Music Festival tour. Gary "Chicken" Hirsh suggested before one of the shows to spell the word "fuck" instead of "fish". Although the crowd loved it, the management of the Schaefer Beer Festival did not and kicked the band off the tour for life. The Ed Sullivan Show then canceled a previously scheduled appearance by the band, telling them to keep the money they had already been paid in exchange for never playing on the show. The modified cheer continued at most of the band's live shows throughout the years, including Woodstock and elsewhere. In Worcester, Massachusetts, McDonald was arrested for obscenity and fined $500 for uttering "fuck" in public.

McDonald subsequently embarked on a solo career. One of his solo albums, the 1973 Vanguard LP Paris Sessions, was reviewed by Robert Christgau in Christgau's Record Guide: Rock Albums of the Seventies (1981), in which he said: "Amazing. The man (repeat: man) has written feminist songs that are both catchy and sensible. Despite the real/honest prison poem and the silly, outdated record fan routines, his best in about five years."

In 2003 McDonald was sued for copyright infringement over his signature song, specifically the "One, two, three, what are we fighting for?" chorus part, as derived from the 1926 early jazz classic "Muskrat Ramble", co-written by Kid Ory. The suit was brought by Ory's daughter Babette, who held the copyright at the time. Since decades had already passed from the time McDonald composed his song in 1965, Ory based her suit on a new version of it recorded by McDonald in 1999. The court, however, upheld McDonald's laches defense, noting that Ory and her father were aware of the original version of the song, with the same questionable section, for some three decades without bringing a suit. In 2006, Ory was ordered to pay McDonald $395,000 for attorney fees and had to sell her copyrights to do so.

In 2004, McDonald regrouped with three of the original members of Country Joe and the Fish (Bruce Barthol, David Bennett Cohen, and Gary "Chicken" Hirsh) and they toured the United States and the United Kingdom as the "Country Joe Band".

In 2005, McDonald joined a larger protest against California Governor Arnold Schwarzenegger's proposed budget cuts at the California State Capitol Building. Later in 2005, political commentator Bill O'Reilly compared McDonald to Cuban President Fidel Castro, remarking on McDonald's involvement in Cindy Sheehan's protests against the Iraq War.

In 2015, McDonald (with assistance from Alec Palao), formed The Electric Music Band; the intention of the group was to perform the early psychedelic material of the early career of Country Joe And The Fish. The band has performed 
Electric Music For The Mind And Body in its entirety, and band members include Palao, the Rain Parade's Matt Piucci and Derek See of the Chocolate Watchband.

In 2017, McDonald released an album on his own Rag Baby label entitled 50.

In 2019, Mc Donald was scheduled to play on Woodstock's 50th Anniversary festival, which was cancelled after negotiations between partners failed.

Personal life 
McDonald was married to Kathe Werum from 1963 to 1966 and married Robin Menken a year after his divorce from Werum. In 1968, Menken gave birth to the couple's first daughter, Seven Anne McDonald, in San Francisco. Seven had a career as a TV child actor in the late 1970s and early 1980s, managed Johnny Depp's Viper Room nightclub and the alternative rock band Smashing Pumpkins in the 1990s, and wrote for Details, Elle, LA Weekly and Harper's Bazaar magazines in the 1990s and 2000s. Seven was the subject of and inspiration behind the song "Silver and Gold". McDonald has noted that his girlfriend at the time, Janis Joplin, showed much anger for breaking up with her to be with Menken but asked him to write a song about her; the result was "Janis".

Seven's name was the inspiration behind the character Six on Blossom, cited by Don Reo on PeopleTV special Blossom Cast Reunion aired 2017, timestamp 10:07-10:33. Don's son went to school with Seven, Don asked his son if she would be cool with him naming a character Seven, Seven said no, so it was either Six or Eight. 

McDonald has four other children, Devin (b. 1976) and Tara (b. 1980) from his marriage to Janice Taylor, and Emily (b. 1988) and Ryan (b. 1991) from his marriage to Kathy Wright.

McDonald lives in Berkeley, California.

Discography

For discography of Country Joe and the Fish, see that entry

Studio albums 

Thinking of Woody Guthrie (1969, Vanguard 6546)
Tonight I'm Singing Just for You (1970, Vanguard 6557)
Hold On It's Coming (1971, Vanguard 79314)
War War War (1971, Vanguard 79315)
Paris Sessions (1973, Vanguard 79328)
Country Joe (1974, Vanguard 79348)
Paradise with an Ocean View (1975, Fantasy 9495)
Love Is a Fire (1976, Fantasy 9511)
Goodbye Blues (1977, Fantasy 9525)
Rock N Roll from Planet Earth (1978, Fantasy 9544)
Leisure Suite (1979, Fantasy 9586)
On My Own (1981, Rag Baby 1012)
Child's Play (1983, Rag Baby 1018)
Peace on Earth (1984, Rag Baby 1019)
Vietnam Experience (1986, Rag Baby 1024/25)
Superstitious Blues (1991, Rag Baby 1028)
Carry On (1995, Rag Baby 1029)
www.countryjoe.com (2000, Rag Baby 1032)
Time Flies By (2012, Rag Baby 1041)
50 (2017 Rag Baby 1042)

Live albums 
Incredible! Live! (1972, Vanguard 79316) Live album
Into the Fray (1981, Rag Baby 2001) Live in Germany
Eat Flowers and Kiss Babies Live with Bevis Frond (1999, Woronzow 33)
Country Joe Live at the Borderline (2007, Rag Baby 1038)
War, War, War (Live) (2008, Rag Baby 1040)
A Tribute to Woody Guthrie (2008, Rag Baby 1039)

Soundtracks 

Quiet Days in Clichy (Soundtrack) (1970, Vanguard 79303) 5 original songs

Collaborative albums 

Crossing Borders with M.L. Liebler (2002, Rag Baby 1034)
Natural Imperfections with Bernie Krause (2005, Rag Baby 1037)

Compilation albums 

Essential Country Joe McDonald (1976, Vanguard 85/86)
Animal Tracks (1983, Animus UK FEEL 1)
Classics (1989, Fantasy 7709)
Best of Country Joe McDonald: The Vanguard Years (1969–1975) (1990, Vanguard 119/20)
Something Borrowed, Something New (The Best Of) (1998, Rag Baby 1030)
A Reflection on Changing Times (2003) Italy-only rerelease of early Vanguard albums
Vanguard Visionaries: Country Joe McDonald (2007, Vanguard 73171)

Filmography

Actor 
 ¡Qué hacer! (1970) as Country 
 Gas-s-s-s! -Or- It Became Necessary to Destroy the World in Order to Save It (1970) as AM Radio
 Zachariah (1971) as a band member, Cracker
 More American Graffiti (1979) as Country Joe and the Fish
 Armistead Maupin's Tales of the City (TV Series) (1993) as Joaquin

References

External links

CJFishlegacy.com
Live Music Archive Country Joe's section of archive.org's free live concert recordings.

1942 births
Living people
American anti–Iraq War activists
American anti–Vietnam War activists
American street performers
American people of Russian-Jewish descent
American people of Scottish descent
American male singers
Jewish American musicians
Country Joe and the Fish members
Jewish rock musicians
Jewish folk singers
American folk singers
American folk guitarists
American acoustic guitarists
Singer-songwriters from California
Guitarists from San Francisco
Guitarists from Washington, D.C.
20th-century American guitarists
American male guitarists
20th-century American male musicians
The Dinosaurs members
Singer-songwriters from Washington, D.C.